Zagorica pri Velikem Gabru is a village in the Municipality of Trebnje in eastern Slovenia. It lies just south of the A2 motorway in the historical region of Lower Carniola. The municipality is now included in the Southeast Slovenia Statistical Region.

Name
The name of the settlement was changed from Zagorica to Zagorica pri Velikem Gabru in 1953. In the past the German name was Sagoritza.

Cultural heritage
During the construction of the motorway an archaeological site with Eneolithic, La Tène–period, Roman-period and early medieval settlement layers was discovered in the area.

References

External links
Zagorica pri Velikem Gabru at Geopedia

Populated places in the Municipality of Trebnje